San Daniele may refer to:

 San Daniele, Padua, a Roman Catholic church and monastery in Padua, region of Veneto, Italy
 San Daniele del Friuli, municipality in the Province of Udine in the Italian region Friuli-Venezia Giulia, in Italy
 San Daniele Po, municipality in the Province of Cremona in the Italian region Lombardy, in Italy